Jane Colburn Levy (born ) is an American actress. After attending the Stella Adler Studio of Acting, she debuted as the original Mandy Milkovich on the Showtime comedy-drama Shameless (2011). Levy left Shameless following its first season to portray the lead of the ABC sitcom Suburgatory from 2011 to 2014. Transitioning to film, Levy collaborated with director Fede Álvarez as the lead of the horror films Evil Dead (2013) and Don't Breathe (2016). She returned to television with series regular roles on the Hulu comedy-drama There's... Johnny! (2017) and horror fantasy Castle Rock (2018), in addition to headlining the Netflix thriller miniseries What/If (2019). From 2020 to 2021, Levy portrayed the title character of the NBC musical comedy-drama Zoey's Extraordinary Playlist, for which she received a Golden Globe nomination for Best Actress – Television Series Musical or Comedy.

Early life
Jane Colburn Levy was born in Los Angeles, California, the daughter of Mary Tilbury, an artist and florist, and Lester Levy, a mediator. When Levy was an infant, her family relocated from Los Angeles to northern California, settling in the city of San Anselmo, where she was raised. Her father is Jewish, and her mother is of English, Scottish, and Irish descent. Levy attended Sir Francis Drake High School, where she was on the hip hop dancing team and was captain of the soccer team; she began playing soccer at age five.

Levy attended Goucher College in Baltimore, Maryland, for one year, where she played on the Division III varsity women's soccer team. She subsequently transferred to the Stella Adler Studio of Acting in New York City, where she graduated from the Conservatory.

Career

2010–2015

Levy moved to Los Angeles after two years in New York City. She played the recurring character Mandy Milkovich, her first TV role, during the first season of the Showtime comedy-drama Shameless in early 2011. In March 2011, she landed the first lead role of her career on the sitcom Suburgatory, with Jeremy Sisto and Cheryl Hines, forcing Emma Greenwell to replace Levy in her Shameless role for season 2 onward. On May 9, 2014, Suburgatory was canceled by ABC after three seasons.

Levy was named by both TV Guide and TheInsider.com as one of the breakout stars of 2011, and was included on the top eleven list of funniest women compiled by AOL. Forbes named her as one of the handful of entertainment stars on their list of 30 under 30 who are "reinventing the world" (a list of the brightest stars of the future). Noting that Suburgatory was "one of the big hits of the new [TV] season" and that Levy would be seen in two upcoming films, Forbes called her "one to watch".

Levy appeared in two films in 2012: Fun Size, the first feature from Gossip Girl creator Josh Schwartz, and Nobody Walks directed by Ry Russo-Young and written by Lena Dunham. Levy later starred in the 2013 remake of the horror classic The Evil Dead, as the drug-dependent Mia, replacing Lily Collins, who had originally been cast. The following year, she starred in two independent films, About Alex and Bang Bang Baby. In 2015, Levy co-starred opposite Rene Russo and Oliver Platt in Frank and Cindy.

2016–present
In 2016, Levy teamed up again with Evil Dead director Fede Álvarez, starring in horror film Don't Breathe, which tells the story of three friends breaking into the house of a wealthy blind man. A sleeper hit, Don't Breathe received critical acclaim and grossed over $156 million. That same year, she starred with Lucas Till in Monster Trucks, Paramount Animation's first live-action/CGI film, directed by Ice Age Chris Wedge.

In 2017, Levy appeared as Dez in I Don't Feel at Home in This World Anymore directed by Macon Blair, and as Elizabeth in an episode of Showtime series Twin Peaks. In November 2017, Levy starred in Hulu's There's...Johnny! as Joy Greenfield, the female lead. That year, Levy also co-starred with Glenn Close in the Amazon pilot Sea Oak, written by George Saunders and directed by Hiro Murai.

In 2018, Levy appeared in Sony Crackle's zombie comedy Office Uprising, and starred as Jackie Torrance, niece of Stephen King's Jack Torrance, in Hulu's critically acclaimed Castle Rock, also inspired by King's work. Levy starred in Mike Kelley's Netflix thriller miniseries What/If alongside Renée Zellweger and Blake Jenner. She appeared in James Franco's romantic drama The Pretenders as Catherine, the female lead. From 2020 to 2021, she starred as the titular character in Zoey's Extraordinary Playlist from NBC, which ran for two seasons.

Personal life
On March 3, 2011, Levy married actor Jaime Freitas. According to court documents, the couple separated on October 31, 2011. In April 2013, Levy filed for divorce, citing irreconcilable differences.

Filmography

Film

Television

Awards and nominations

References

External links

 
 

1989 births
21st-century American actresses
Actresses from Los Angeles
Actresses from the San Francisco Bay Area
American film actresses
American people of English descent
American people of Irish descent
American people of Scottish descent
American television actresses
Goucher College alumni
Jewish American actresses
Living people
People from San Anselmo, California
21st-century American Jews